Barbara Phifer is a former United Methodist pastor who started her term as a Democratic member of the Missouri House of Representatives, representing the state's 90th House district, in January 2021.

Career
Phifer is a graduate of Cornell College and St. Paul School of Theology, and served as a United Methodist pastor for over 40 years. Her preaching career included a five-year stint in Montevideo, Uruguay under a dictatorship, an experience which she said gave her "an understanding of the dangers of authoritarianism, which is what I see in the [Republican] party right now". Along with her criticism of Donald Trump, Phifer ran on a platform of expanding Medicaid, improving public education, and supporting gun control and social justice issues such as women's and LGBTQ rights.

Phifer had not thought about entering politics until after retiring from preaching, but decided to run for the seat vacated by Deb Lavender who was running for state Senate. In 2020, Phifer defeated her Republican opponent in the general election for Missouri's 90th state House district.

Electoral History 
 Rep. Phifer has not yet had any opponents in the Democratic Primary election, winning the party nomination by default each time.

Personal life
Phifer lives in Kirkwood, Missouri with her husband, and has five children and seven grandchildren.

References

Living people
21st-century American politicians
21st-century American women politicians
Women state legislators in Missouri
Cornell College alumni
Democratic Party members of the Missouri House of Representatives
Year of birth missing (living people)